James Forbes (May 1773  – 6 July 1861) was a British gardener and botanist.

Forbes was born in May 1773 in Bridgend, Perthshire. He was the gardener for the Duke of Bedford at Woburn Abbey. He became a member of the Linnean Society of London in 1832.

Sir William Jackson Hooker (1785 – 1865) named the species Oncidium forbesii (in the family of Orchidaceae) after him. Forbes became a member of the Royal Society on 24 March 1803.

Forbes died on 6 July 1681, at Woburn Abbey, Bedfordshire, aged 88.

References

External links
 
 
 

British botanists
1773 births
1861 deaths
People from Bridgend, Perth and Kinross